Aleksandr Vasilyevich Shvetsov (born 17 December 1980) is a Russian former footballer.

External links
  Player page on the official FC Sibir website

1980 births
Footballers from Moscow
Living people
Expatriate footballers in Latvia
FC Anzhi Makhachkala players
FC Khimki players
PFC Krylia Sovetov Samara players
FC Luch Vladivostok players
FC Sibir Novosibirsk players
FC Tom Tomsk players
FC Torpedo Moscow players
PFC CSKA Moscow players
Russian expatriate footballers
Russian expatriate sportspeople in Latvia
Russian footballers
Russian Premier League players
FC Vityaz Podolsk players
Association football midfielders
FC Avangard Kursk players
FC Olimp-Dolgoprudny players